Karen Kraft (born May 3, 1969 in San Mateo, California) is an American rower and two-time Olympic medal winner. She was a university assistant coach for women's rowing at the University of Wisconsin- Madison from 2007 to 2013. She is a yoga teacher at Inner Fire Yoga and a personal trainer at Functional Integrated Training in Madison, Wis.

References

External links
 
 
 

1969 births
Living people
People from San Mateo, California
Rowers at the 1996 Summer Olympics
Rowers at the 2000 Summer Olympics
Olympic bronze medalists for the United States in rowing
Olympic silver medalists for the United States in rowing
American female rowers
World Rowing Championships medalists for the United States
Medalists at the 2000 Summer Olympics
Medalists at the 1996 Summer Olympics
Pan American Games silver medalists for the United States
Pan American Games medalists in rowing
Medalists at the 1999 Pan American Games
Rowers at the 1999 Pan American Games
21st-century American women